Kim Churchill (born 26 September 1990 in Canberra) is an Australian folk, rock, and blues singer, songwriter, and musician. He has released five albums: With Sword and Shield/Kim Churchill in 2010, Detail of Distance in 2012, Into the Steel in 2013, Silence/Win in 2014 and Weight Falls in 2017. He is signed to Montreal-based Canadian label Indica Records.

Career
Kim Churchill was born in Canberra and moved to the town of Merimbula at around age seven. He picked his first guitar when he was 4 years old when his father promised him a guitar if he did well in school. He was trained in classical guitar for ten years. He accompanies his guitar with blues harp (harmonica), stomp box, drums, and percussion instruments. He also plays lapsteel and tambourine.

He started singing and playing in front of crowds very early, writing songs while experimenting various tunes or while busking in various venues. An avid fan of surfing, he incorporated the sport in many of his songs and music videos. Churchill tours extensively and has become a favourite during music festivals including the East Coast Blues & Roots Music Festival (Australia's "Bluesfest"), the Woodford Folk Festival, and other Australian venues. He has particular following in Canada where he took part in Canadian Music Week, the Ottawa Folk Festival and the famous Montreal International Jazz Festival. He enjoys good following in the United States where he performed at the South by Southwest festival in Austin, Texas and the International Folk Federation Conference in Memphis, plus a tour in England, other European venues, and in Japan.

He released his debut single "Loving Home" that received regular airplay nationally on Australian Triple J radio and ABC Radio National, as well as local and community stations all over Australia. His debut album was entitled With Sword and Shield and released under the title Kim Churchill internationally.

Churchill's second studio album was released on 15 May 2012 being the album Detail of Distance. It was recorded in Vancouver, Canada and was produced by Tod Simko and released by Indica Records. Owing to his popularity in Canada, the release was supported by a 2012 pan-Canadian national summer tour. In 2013 Churchill supported Billy Bragg on his Tooth and Nail tour.

His fourth album Silence/Win was released on 1 April 2014 through Fontana North. Produced by Warne Livesey, it was recorded primarily in sessions in Ucluelet on Vancouver Island, BC, Canada. He also engaged on a pan-Canadian tour to promote the album. The track "Some Days the Rain May Fall" from the album charted on ARIA, the official Australian Singles Chart reaching number 86. Another track from the same album "Window to the Sky" was remixed by the French deep house and electro music producer The Avener and released in France as "You're My Window to the Sky" and charting on SNEP, the French Official Singles Chart.

In December 2022, Churchill confirmed his 2014 single "Window to the Sky", had reached platinum certification in Australia.

Reception
As part of a review of a Billy Bragg concert for the Vancouver Weekly, critic Jason Motz said:
"Opening on this night was the young, barefooted Aussie, Kim Churchill. Churchill made the most of an acoustic guitar, kick drum, pedals and a harmonica. Creating a sound I can only describe as psychedelic whale music, ocean-side blues or countrified Nick Drake, Churchill delivered an off-the-cuff set punctuated by a cover of Dylan’s "Subterranean Homesick Blues". Kim Churchill. Remember that name. He’s going to impress a whole mess of people on this tour. Next year, he could very well be headlining the Vogue."

Discography

Albums

Mixed Tape

Live albums

EPs

Singles

Awards and nominations
In 2009, Kim Churchill won Australia's National Youth Folk Artist of the Year.

APRA Awards
The APRA Awards are presented annually from 1982 by the Australasian Performing Right Association (APRA), "honouring composers and songwriters".

! 
|-
| 2015 || "Window to the Sky" || Blues & Roots Work of the Year ||  || 
|-
| 2019 || "Secondhand Car" || Blues & Roots Work of the Year ||  || 
|-

National Live Music Awards
The National Live Music Awards (NLMAs) are a broad recognition of Australia's diverse live industry, celebrating the success of the Australian live scene. The awards commenced in 2016.

|-
| National Live Music Awards of 2016
| Kim Churchill
| Live Roots Act of the Year
|

References

External links
 
 

Australian songwriters
1990 births
Living people
21st-century Australian singers
21st-century Australian male singers
Fontana North artists
Australian harmonica players